The First National Bank is a five-story building in Grand Forks, North Dakota, that was built in 1914–15 and listed on the National Register of Historic Places in 1982.    It was built for the Scandinavian-American Bank, but has been identified as the First National Bank building since 1929.

History
When it was founded, the Scandinavian-American Bank had its offices in the Metropolitan Opera House in Grand Forks. The new bank building was constructed in 1914–15 and occupied in 1915. When the bank later obtained a charter as a national bank, it took the name Northwestern National Bank. In 1929, it merged with the First National Bank, and the combined bank located in this building. First National Bank failed in 1933, during the Great Depression, but was replaced by a new First National Bank entity that later became Alerus Financial in 2000.

It is considered an "outstanding example" of the use of Classical Revival architecture in the context of a large commercial building. The two sides that face the street have two-part facades in which the lower two stories are fronted by rusticated ashlar piers built on top of polished granite blocks and the three upper stories are faced with red brick. The top of the building is decorated with a stone cornice.

The property was included in a 1981 study of the historical resources of downtown Grand Forks. It was damaged by flooding and fire in the 1997 Red River flood; it is the only building on the block that was not demolished as a result of flooding and fire.

References

Related reading
Ashley Shelby (2008) Red River Rising: The Anatomy of a Flood and the Survival of an American City (Minnesota Historical Society) 

Bank buildings on the National Register of Historic Places in North Dakota
Buildings designated early commercial in the National Register of Historic Places in North Dakota
Neoclassical architecture in North Dakota
Vernacular architecture in North Dakota
Commercial buildings completed in 1915
National Register of Historic Places in Grand Forks, North Dakota
Scandinavian-American history
1915 establishments in North Dakota